Godwin Elliot Loraine Friday (born 28 September 1959) is a Vincentian politician. Friday is the Leader of the Opposition of St. Vincent and the Grenadines, Member of Parliament for the Northern Grenadines and President of the New Democratic Party.

In the 28 March 2001 general election, Friday was elected to the House of Assembly for the Northern Grenadines constituency. He retained his seat in the 2005, 2010, 2015 and 2020 elections.

Education 
Friday earned a Bachelor of Arts in history and political science from the University of Waterloo, and a Bachelor of Laws from Queen's University in Canada.  He graduated with a Master's degree in history from Waterloo in 1985. In 1989, he graduated with a Doctorate in political studies from Queens.

Career

In 2016 Arnhim Eustace, the party leader and opposition leader of Saint Vincent and the Grenadines, resigned, which left Friday with the position as party leader and opposition leader.

Publications 

 Islands in the Stream: The development of a machinery for the conduct of external affairs in the Bahamas and Bahamian foreign policy, 1973-1985 (MA Thesis, 1985)
 The Caribbean Basin Initiative and industrial development in Trinidad and Tobago (1989)
 A Political Economy of 'State Capitalism' in Trinidad and Tobago: social struggles and the development process (PhD Thesis, 1989)

References

External links
New Democratic Party home page

1959 births
Living people
New Democratic Party (Saint Vincent and the Grenadines) politicians
People from Bequia
Members of the House of Assembly of Saint Vincent and the Grenadines
University of Waterloo alumni
Queen's University at Kingston alumni